Jardines de Mater Terra is a private cemetery in Ciudad del Plata, San José Department, Uruguay. 

It is located 29 km west of downtown Montevideo, on the Ruta 1.

History
The cemetery was established in 1993.

References

External links
 Mater Terra

Cemeteries in San José Department
1993 establishments in Uruguay